The anterior atlantoaxial ligament is a strong membrane, fixed, above, to the lower border of the anterior arch of the atlas; below, to the front of the body of the axis.

It is strengthened in the middle line by a rounded cord, which connects the tubercle on the anterior arch of the atlas to the body of the axis, and is a continuation upward of the anterior longitudinal ligament.

Anatomy

Anatomical relations 
The anterior atlantoaxial ligament is situated anterior to the longus capitis muscle.

See also
 Atlanto-axial joint

References

External links
 Description at spineuniverse.com

Ligaments of the head and neck
Bones of the vertebral column